Wheeling is the name of the following places in the U.S. state of Indiana:
Wheeling, Carroll County, Indiana
Wheeling, Delaware County, Indiana
Wheeling, Gibson County, Indiana